Fouetté  is a musical feature film in the genre of drama of Russian film director Boris Yermolayev and director-choreographer Vladimir Vasiliev, released in 1986.

Plot
Prima-ballerina Elena Knyazeva prepares for her performance on the anniversary jubilee for the theater Swan Lake on the eve of her fiftieth birthday and simultaneously participates in the production of the innovative ballet Master and Margarita. Suddenly, the choreographer gives the role of a young ballerina, with whom he begins an affair. Overcoming jealousy and desperation, Knyazeva begins to work with the student over the image of Margarita.

In the film are Valentin Gaft's poems.

Cast
 Ekaterina Maximova as Elena Knyazeva
 Vladimir Vasiliev as Andrey Novikov
  Aristarkh Livanov as Knyazev
 Valentin Gaft as Poet
 Yevgeny Kolobov as  conductor

Criticism
The beautiful Balgolf ballet has never been shown with such force and truth as in this film. The pains of labor and creativity are enormous, almost intolerable, deadly. But the same Spessivtseva once wrote in her diary: You will not die from dancing, you will leave them —  and nothing will happen, and you're nobody's, and from you, and to you. This sensation permeates the film, all the fates in it.

There is one more tragic feeling: the inevitability of leaving, the end, the thought of how to find a way out in this care.

(Boris Lyvov-Anokhin, People's Artist of the RSFSR).

References

External links
 

Soviet musical drama films
Films about ballet
1980s musical drama films
Lenfilm films
1986 films
1980s Russian-language films
1986 drama films